The King of Freedom World Junior Heavyweight Championship, also referred to as the , is a professional wrestling championship created and promoted by Pro Wrestling Freedoms. Only wrestlers under the junior heavyweight weight-limit may hold the championship.

The current and inaugural champion is Kamui.

History 
On September 18, 2022, Pro Wrestling Freedoms announced an eight-man tournament that would crown the first King of Freedom World Junior Heavyweight Champion. At the "Go for it Freedoms! 2022" event, Kamui defeated Masaoka in the final to become the inaugural champion.

Inaugural tournament

Reigns

See also 
Professional wrestling in Japan

References 

Junior heavyweight wrestling championships
World professional wrestling championships